Miss Picardy is a French beauty pageant which selects a representative for the Miss France national competition from the region of Picardy. The first Miss Picardy was crowned in 1927, although the title was not used regularly until 1985.

The current Miss Picardy is Bérénice Legendre, who was crowned Miss Picardy 2022 on 16 October 2022. Four women from Picardy have been crowned Miss France:
Lyne Lassalle, who was crowned Miss France 1936
Sylviane Carpentier, who was crowned Miss France 1953
Élodie Gossuin, who was crowned Miss France 2001
Rachel Legrain-Trapani, who was crowned Miss France 2007

Results summary
Miss France: Lyne Lassalle (1935); Sylviane Carpentier (1952); Élodie Gossuin (2000); Rachel Legrain-Trapani (2006)
3rd Runner-Up: Anastasia Winnebroot (2010)
4th Runner-Up: Véronique Babic (1982)
5th Runner-Up: Adeline Legris-Croisel (2014)
6th Runner-Up: Charlotte Desauty (2002)
Top 12/Top 15: Sophie Vanharen (1998); Émilie Mika (2012); Myrtille Cauchefer (2016); Morgane Fradon (2019); Bérénice Legendre (2022)

Titleholders

Notes

References

External links

Miss France regional pageants
Beauty pageants in France
Women in France